The 2002–03 season was the fifth season in the history of Northern Spirit (now North West Sydney Spirit). It was also the fifth season in the National Soccer League. Northern Spirit finished 6th in their National Soccer League regular season and 5th in the NSL Championship play-offs.

Players

Transfers

Transfers in

Transfers out

Competitions

Overview

National Soccer League

League table

Results summary

Results by round

Matches

Championship play-offs

Statistics

Appearances and goals
Players with no appearances not included in the list.

Clean sheets

References

North West Sydney Spirit FC seasons